Deven Robertson (born 30 June 2001) is a professional Australian rules footballer playing for the Brisbane Lions in the Australian Football League (AFL).

Early life
Robertson grew up in Northam, Western Australia. He played junior football for Manning and also played at high school while boarding at Aquinas College, Perth. His senior football was played with the Perth Football Club in the West Australian Football League. In 2019 captained Western Australia at the 2019 AFL Under 18 Championships and won the Larke Medal as the best player in the tournament. His performance saw him selected by the Brisbane lions with their first pick in the 2019 AFL draft.

AFL Career

Statistics
Updated to the end of the 2022 season.

|-
| 2020 ||  || 2
| 1 || 0 || 0 || 3 || 4 || 7 || 0 || 3 || 0.0 || 0.0 || 3.0 || 4.0 || 7.0 || 0.0 || 3.0
|-
| 2021 ||  || 2
| 16 || 4 || 2 || 110 || 100 || 210 || 53 || 67 || 0.3 || 0.1 || 6.9 || 6.3 || 13.1 || 3.3 || 4.2
|-
| 2022 ||  || 2
| 8 || 3 || 0 || 47 || 48 || 95 || 21 || 32 || 0.4 || 0.0 || 5.9 || 6.0 || 11.9 || 2.6 || 4.0
|- class=sortbottom
! colspan=3 | Career
! 25 !! 7 !! 2 !! 160 !! 152 !! 312 !! 74 !! 102 !! 0.3 !! 0.1 !! 6.4 !! 6.1 !! 12.5 !! 3.0 !! 4.1
|}

Notes

Honours and achievements
Individual
 AFL Rising Star nominee: 2021 (round 15)
 Larke Medal: 2019

References

External links

2001 births
Living people
Brisbane Lions players
People educated at Aquinas College, Perth